Kachur is a Ukrainian surname meaning "drake" (male duck). Alternative transliterations include Kaczur, Kačur, Katchur, Katchour and Katschur. It is a cognate of the Polish surname Kaczor.

People

Kachur
Eddie Kachur (1934–2014), Canadian professional ice hockey player
Havrylo Kachur (born 1954), Soviet/Ukrainian football defender and coach
Pavlo Kachur (born 1953), Ukrainian politician
Ruslan Kachur (born 1982), Ukrainian footballer
Yana Kachur (born 1997), Ukrainian sprinter

Other forms
Gale Katchur, Canadian politician
Nicholas Kaczur (born 1979), Canadian football player

See also
 

Ukrainian-language surnames